T. Ramasamy is an Indian politician and served as a Member of the Legislative Assembly of Tamil Nadu from 2006 to 2011. He was elected to the Tamil Nadu legislative assembly as a Communist Party of India candidate from Srivilliputhur constituency in 2006 election.

References 

Communist Party of India politicians from Tamil Nadu
Living people
All India Anna Dravida Munnetra Kazhagam politicians
Year of birth missing (living people)
Tamil Nadu MLAs 1985–1989
Tamil Nadu MLAs 2006–2011